The first South San Gabriel album, South San Gabriel Songs/Music, was released under the nom de plume Centro-Matic. The band later decided to keep the straightforward rock songs for Centro-Matic and release the quieter songs as South San Gabriel. However, there's already no reference to Centro-Matic on the Munich Records (The Netherlands) release of Songs/Music.

Track listing 
 Ninety Secretaries Down 
 Proud Son Of Gaffney 
 To Accompany 
 The Fireworks Treatment 
 With Broken Hands 
 The Ensuing Light Of Day 
 One-hundred Thousand Bridesmaids 
 Glacial Slurs 
 Innocence Kindly Waits
 Destroyer

Personnel 
 Will Johnson - vocals, guitars
 Scott Danbom - vocals, keyboards, violin
 Mark Hedman - bass
 Matt Pence - drums

References

External links
Official site

Centro-Matic albums
2000 albums